Samuel Palmer Saunders (born July 30, 1987) is an American professional golfer and the grandson of Arnold Palmer.

Early years
Born and raised in Orlando, Florida, Saunders parents are Roy and Amy (Palmer) Saunders; his mother Amy is the younger daughter of Arnold and Winnie Palmer. Saunders attended high school at Trinity Prep in Winter Park. As a senior, he won his second club championship at Bay Hill Club and Lodge by seventeen strokes, which earned him an invitation to the 2006 PGA Tour event hosted by his grandfather. He attended Clemson University in South Carolina, and skipped his senior season to turn pro.

Pro career
In 2011, he played a total of 13 events – eight on the PGA Tour, with a best finish of 15th at Pebble Beach – and the Nationwide Tour, where he finished tenth in Panama. That same year, Saunders made it to the final stage of the tour's qualifying school, but finished tied for 109th and did not earn a PGA Tour card. Saunders finished 50th on the 2012 Web.com Tour season in his first full professional season.

Saunders played on the Web.com Tour in 2014 after earning his tour card through qualifying school. He finished 13th in the Web.com Tour Finals to earn his PGA Tour card for the 2015 season. On September 29, 2017, he shot 59 in the first round of the Web.com Tour Championship, including a 6 birdie finish. In the 2017–18 PGA Tour season, Saunders earned $981,936 and placed 120th in the FedEx Cup standings. In the 2018–19 PGA Tour season, Saunders earned $413,887 and placed 173rd in the FedEx Cup standings.

In August 2019, Saunders suffered a compound fracture of the clavicle that was incurred in a motorized skateboard accident. Saunders stated he expected to be out for 4–6 months.

Personal life
Saunders and his wife Kelly were married in 2012 and reside in Atlantic Beach, Florida, with their sons, Cohen and Ace

Playoff record
PGA Tour playoff record (0–1)

Korn Ferry Tour playoff record (0–1)

Results in major championships

CUT = missed the half-way cut
"T" indicates a tie for a place

See also
2014 Web.com Tour Finals graduates
2015 Web.com Tour Finals graduates
2017 Web.com Tour Finals graduates
Lowest rounds of golf

References

External links

American male golfers
Clemson Tigers men's golfers
PGA Tour golfers
Korn Ferry Tour graduates
Golfers from Orlando, Florida
Golfers from Colorado
People from St. Augustine, Florida
Sportspeople from Fort Collins, Colorado
Trinity Preparatory School alumni
1987 births
Living people